Óbuda was a town in Hungary that was merged with Buda and Pest on 17 November 1873; it now forms part of District III-Óbuda-Békásmegyer of Budapest. The name means Old Buda in Hungarian (in German, Alt-Ofen). The name in Bosnian, Croatian and Serbian for this city is Stari Budim, but the local Croat minority calls it Obuda (the name "Budim" is used for the fortress in Buda). In Czech it is called Starý Budín.

The island (Óbuda Island) next to this part of the city today hosts the Sziget Festival, a huge music and cultural festival.

Óbuda's centre is Fő tér (Main Square), connected to a small square with a sculpture of people waiting for the rain to stop. It is accessible by HÉV (Szentlélek tér station).

History
Settlements dating from the Stone Age have been found in Óbuda. The Romans built there Aquincum, the capital of Pannonia province. Hungarians arrived after 900 and it served as an important settlement of major tribal leaders, later kings. The site was the location of royal and ecclesiastic foundations. King Béla IV built a new capital after the 1241-42 catastrophic Mongol invasion in Buda, somewhat south of Óbuda. In the fourteenth century, Óbuda featured a convent of the Poor Clares.

The obscured historical remains of Óbuda, together with the role it played in nineteenth-century poetry, has resulted it being subject to various historical disputes.

A commemorative plaque appears on the building erected on the site of the former Jewish Elementary School in Óbuda (Óbuda Street Nr 6) commemorating victims of the Holocaust.

People
Károly Bebo (1712–1779) – sculptor
József Manes Österreicher (1759–1831) – physician
Pál Harrer (1829–1914) – the first and only mayor of Óbuda
Egon Orowan (1902–1989) – physicist and metallurgist
István Bibó (1911–1979) – politician and political theorist

Museums
Aquincum Museum, small museum displays jewels, glassware, metal tools, and wall paintings relating to the lives of ancient Romans living in Aquincum. The museum's outdoor site contains remnants of the town, including courtyards, baths, a market place, shrines, large columns, sculptures, and a stone sarcophagus. Roman ruins elsewhere in Óbuda include baths that served the Roman legionnaires stationed in Aquincum, the Hercules Villa, and two amphitheatres, the Aquincum Civil Amphitheater and the larger Aquincum Military Amphitheatre.
Kassák Museum, a branch museum of the Petőfi Literary Museum; features items relating to the life and work of the Hungarian avant garde writer Lajos Kassák (1887-1967)
Obudai Museum, primary collection features local history; the museum also encompasses Hungary's only toy museum, and the Zsigmond Kun Flat Museum, which features folk furniture
Museum of Hungarian Trade and Tourism
Vasarely Museum, Zichy Palace, features work by Vasarely, as well as temporary exhibitions of other Hungarian artists

Sport
III. Kerületi TVE, football team
33 FC, football team

References

External links

 
A Walk through Old Buda 

 
Chabad communities
Chabad in Europe
Jewish communities in Hungary
Roman settlements in Hungary